In mathematics, a Tannakian category is a particular kind of monoidal category C, equipped with some extra structure relative to a given field K. The role of such categories C is to approximate, in some sense, the category of linear representations of an algebraic group G defined over K. A number of major applications of the theory have been made, or might be made in pursuit of some of the central conjectures of contemporary algebraic geometry and number theory.

The name is taken from Tadao Tannaka and Tannaka–Krein duality, a theory about compact groups G and their representation theory. The theory was developed first in the school of Alexander Grothendieck. It was later reconsidered by Pierre Deligne, and some simplifications made. The pattern of the theory is that of Grothendieck's Galois theory, which is a theory about finite permutation representations of groups G which are profinite groups.

The gist of the theory, which is rather elaborate in detail in the exposition of Saavedra Rivano, is that the fiber functor Φ of the Galois theory is replaced by a tensor functor T from C to K-Vect. The group of natural transformations of Φ to itself, which turns out to be a profinite group in the Galois theory, is replaced by the group (a priori only a monoid) of natural transformations of T into itself, that respect the tensor structure. This is by nature not an algebraic group, but an inverse limit of algebraic groups (pro-algebraic group).

Formal definition

A neutral Tannakian category is a rigid abelian tensor category, such that there exists a K-tensor functor to the category of finite dimensional K-vector spaces that is exact and faithful.

Applications

The construction is used in cases where a Hodge structure or l-adic representation is to be considered in the light of group representation theory. For example, the Mumford–Tate group and motivic Galois group are potentially to be recovered from one cohomology group or Galois module, by means of a mediating Tannakian category it generates.

Those areas of application are closely connected to the theory of motives. Another place in which Tannakian categories have been used is in connection with the Grothendieck–Katz p-curvature conjecture; in other words, in bounding monodromy groups.

The Geometric Satake equivalence establishes an equivalence between representations of the Langlands dual group  of a reductive group G and certain equivariant perverse sheaves on the affine Grassmannian associated to G. This equivalence provides a non-combinatorial construction of the Langlands dual group.

Extensions
 has established partial Tannaka duality results in the situation where the category is R-linear, where R is no longer a field (as in classical Tannakian duality), but certain valuation rings.  showed a Tannaka duality result if R is a Dedekind ring.

 has initiated the study of Tannaka duality in the context of infinity-categories.

References

Further reading 
M. Larsen and R. Pink. Determining representations from invariant dimensions. Invent. math., 102:377–389, 1990.

Monoidal categories
Algebraic groups
Duality theories